The Artillery Sergeant Kalen (Polish: Ogniomistrz Kaleń) is a Polish war movie released in 1961. The movie was directed by Ewa Petelska and Czesław Petelski. The movie is about the fate of Polish soldier named Kaleń (acted by Wiesław Gołas) who fought with UPA in 1945.

References

External links

 Ogniomistrz Kaleń at the Filmweb.pl 

Polish war drama films
Polish black-and-white films
1960s Polish-language films
1960s war drama films
1961 films
Films directed by Ewa Petelska
Films directed by Czesław Petelski
1961 drama films
Polish World War II films
Films about Polish resistance during World War II